The Nogais (represented in Turkvision as Nogai) participated in the Turkvision Song Contest for the first time at the Turkvision Song Contest 2020, hosted in Istanbul, Turkey.

Origins of the contest

Turkvision is an annual song contest which was created by TÜRKSOY in cooperation with the Turkish music channel TMB TV. Based on the similar format of the Eurovision Song Contest, Turkvision focuses primarily on participating Turkic countries and regions. The participating countries and regions have to take part in the semi-final. TÜRKSOY has stated that televoting is going to be introduced in the future.

History
In October 2020, it was announced that the Nogai would be making their first appearance at the Turkvision Song Contest, represented by the singer Zhanna Musayeva with the song "Munaima". It marked the first representation of a people group in the contest, as opposed to a specific country or region. It was the first Turkvision entry to be performed in the Nogai language.

Participation overview

Related involvement

Jury members

References

Countries in the Turkvision Song Contest
Turkvision